= Hubei Guangbo Wang =

Radio network in Hubei, China

- Traditional Chinese: 湖北廣播網
- Simplified Chinese: 湖北广播网
Transcriptions
Standard Mandarin
- Hanyu Pinyin: Húběi Guǎngbō Wǎng
Yue: Cantonese
- Jyutping: Wu^{4}bak^{1} Gwong^{2}bo^{3} Mong^{5}

Hubei Guangbo Wang (Chinese: 湖北广播网), which translates as the Hubei Broadcasting Network, consists of a group of radio stations serving the greater Hubei Province area.

== List of Hubei Guangbo Wang Radio Stations ==
Hubei Stations
Frequency	Description
104.6 FM/774 AM	Local Hubei News
99.8 FM	Financial and Business News
103.8 FM	Classical Music Radio
107.8 FM	The Voice of City
102.6 FM	Women and Children Channel
96.6 FM	Life Channel
